Jason Greeley (born March 11, 1977) is a Canadian singer-songwriter from Upper Island Cove, Newfoundland and Labrador who is best known as a contestant on the second season of Canadian Idol. He released his solo album, Live...Love...Sing... in 2005 and released his self-titled follow-up album in late-2009. Greeley is signed to Royalty Records out of Alberta.

Career
On June 14, 2005, Greeley released his debut CD Live...Love...Sing.... The album's first single released was Slammin' Doors. He received 4 Music Industry Association of Newfoundland and Labrador (MIANL, now MusicNL) award nominations, winning the Entertainer of the Year award. In 2006, Greeley received an East Coast Music Award nomination for Country Album of the Year.

Canadian Idol 
In season two of Canadian Idol, Greeley reached the top-four round before being eliminated. At 27, he was the oldest of the top 10. Greeley placed third in his top-32 group behind Shane Wiebe and Manoah Hartmann but he qualified, along with Elena Juatco, for the top 10 through the wildcard round where he was the top vote-getter. Below is his list of performances with the theme in brackets:

First audition: "Sad Songs (Say So Much)" by Elton John
Toronto auditions: "Islands in the Stream" by Kenny Rogers and Dolly Parton (duet with Danielle Falco)
Top 32: "Heaven" by Bryan Adams
Wildcard: "Sad Songs (Say So Much)" by Elton John
Top 10: "Cuts Like a Knife" by Bryan Adams (Canadian Hits)
Top 9: "Saturday Night's Alright for Fighting" by Elton John (British Invasion)
Top 8: "Proud Mary" by Creedence Clearwater Revival
Top 7: "Easy" by the Commodores
Top 6: "Rainy Day People" by Gordon Lightfoot
Top 5: "Bad Case of Loving You (Doctor, Doctor)" by Robert Palmer (Summertime Hits)
Top 4: "I Won't Dance" by Frank Sinatra, "It Had To Be You" by Harry Connick Jr. (Big Band)

Discography

Live...Love...Sing... (2005)
1. Live...Love...Sing
2. Another Day
3. Slammin' Doors
4. Sad Songs
5. Get Over You
6. Shady Ole Town
7. Tonight (co-written with Sass Jordan)
8. Living For Nothing
9. Dreams
10. Tear Me Away

Reception
This album has sold a total of 12,000 copies.

Jason Greeley (2009)
1. Born That Way
2. Usually
3. Godbye Jersey
4. Around For A Reason
5. Get A Life
6. Slammin Doors
7. Good Part
8. Live Our Lives
9. Walk Away
10. Louder Than Words
11. Four Walls
12. What You Gotta Do (Dad's Song)

References

1977 births
Living people
Canadian Idol participants
People from Carbonear
Musicians from Newfoundland and Labrador